A Good Git-Together is a 1959 studio album by Jon Hendricks. It was Hendricks' first solo album, and featured Cannonball Adderley and Wes Montgomery.

Track listing
 "Everything Started in the House of the Lord" – 1:03
 "Music in the Air" (Gigi Gryce) – 3:58
 "Feed Me" – 3:50
 "I'll Die Happy" – 2:22
 "Pretty Strange" (Randy Weston) – 2:53
 "The Shouter" (Gildo Mahones) – 5:03
 "Minor Catastrophe" – 5:21
 "Social Call" (Gryce) – 2:22
 "Out of the Past" (Benny Golson) – 4:55
 "A Good Git-Together" – 3:41
 "I'm Gonna Shout (Everything Started in the House of the Lord)" – 2:26

All songs written by Jon Hendricks, collaborators indicated.

Personnel
Jon Hendricks – vocals
 Nat Adderley – cornet (2, 5, 6, 8, 9) 
 Cannonball Adderley – alto saxophone (2, 5, 6, 8, 9)
 Pony Poindexter – alto saxophone, vocals (1, 3, 4, 7, 10, 11)
 Wes Montgomery – guitar
 Gildo Mahones – piano
 Ike Isaacs – double bass (1, 4, 7)
 Monk Montgomery – double bass (2, 3, 5, 6, 8-11)
 Walter Bolden – drums (2, 3, 5, 6, 8-11)
 Jimmy Wormworth – drums (1, 4, 7)

References 

Jon Hendricks albums
1959 albums
Pacific Jazz Records albums